First Federal Plaza is a high-rise building located in Rochester, New York. It was completed in 1975.

The building is known for its circular top, which used to be a  revolving restaurant called Changing Scene. That closed in 1990 and the rotating mechanism was dismantled. The space was rented out by local Rochester attorney Christina Agola until she was disbarred over allegations of deceitful conduct.

The building is located at 28 East Main Street 

The building is also home to the studios for the Stephens Media Group radio stations in Rochester. (WFKL, WZNE, and WRMM-FM). In addition to the studios, WZNE and WRMM-FM both maintain an auxiliary (backup) transmitter facility on the top of the building.

The building has been used as part of 21 Stories for Scouts, an annual fundraiser for the Boy Scouts of America.

See also

List of tallest buildings in Rochester, New York

References

External links
Official website
Rochester Wiki Listing - photo source.

Skyscraper office buildings in Rochester, New York
Office buildings completed in 1976